Goggle Fishing Bear is a 1949 MGM cartoon, featuring Barney Bear who attempts to go goggle fishing, with the aid of a sea lion. It is the 16th Barney Bear cartoon and the last Barney Bear cartoon to be supervised by Michael Lah and Preston Blair.

Plot
The cartoon starts with Barney driving a motor boat at sea, where he attempts to fish. After dropping the anchor, a sea lion assumes that they are playing catch and brings the anchor back. Barney tricks the sea lion into swimming the other way, by pretending to throw the anchor in one direction, then throwing it in another. Only his foot was tied to the rope, which causes Barney to fall in the sea, but the sea lion saves him.

A fish is stuck in Barney's suit, in which the sea lion, in an attempt to catch the fish with a trident, pokes Barney's backside. The fish gets out of Barney's suit, lands back in the water and the sea lion aides Barney in catching it. After chasing it into a cave, the sea lion unsuccessfully tries to warn Barney of an oncoming shark, but Barney dismisses his warning, instead he shoos it away. The sea lion came back, trying to warn him again, but eventually flees after seeing the shark is coming and leaving the unnoticed bear alone.

The shark pulls up behind Barney, bumping his bottom to face him. Barney, now thinking that is more of the sea lion's goading; he turns around and pokes it with his trident violently. Barney then stops, realizing that was not a sea lion, but an enraged shark that the sea lion was warning him about before. Barney tries evading the shark by pretending to be an underwater king, which fails.

Barney tries hiding under a rock, which is soon revealed to be an octopus that swims away in fear, and the shark tries eating Barney. The sea lion tries to stop it by keeping the jaws open, to which the shark's teeth nibbles Barney in the rear. Barney and the sea lion get back to the boat with the shark in pursuit. The shark uses its fin to saw the boat in half and Barney tries reconnecting it. Using its tail as a propeller, the shark strikes the boat. But before the shark finally eats Barney, the anchor suddenly lands on its head and Barney and the sea lion use the shark to ride back to land as the cartoon irises out.

See also
The Bear That Couldn't Sleep
The Rookie Bear
Bah Wilderness
Wee-Willie Wildcat
Bird-Brain Bird Dog

References

External links 

1949 animated films
1949 short films
Films directed by Preston Blair
Films directed by Michael Lah
Metro-Goldwyn-Mayer animated short films
1940s American animated films
1940s animated short films
1949 films
Films scored by Scott Bradley
Films produced by Fred Quimby
Films about fishing
Films about shark attacks
Metro-Goldwyn-Mayer cartoon studio short films
Barney Bear films